Jirdeh Rural District is a rural district (dehestan) in the Central District of Shaft County, Gilan Province, Iran. At the 2006 census, its population was 16,565, in 4,185 families. The rural district has 31 villages.

References 

Rural Districts of Gilan Province
Shaft County